Sawma Rabba is the East Syriac liturgical season that begins seven weeks before Easter, falling during Great Lent, and culminates on Resurrection Sunday. It begins with Pētūrtta Sunday and extends precisely seven weeks until Easter. Among the descendant Churches of the Church of the East in India, the Sawma Rabba is popularly known as the Fifty days' fast, since Resurrection Sunday occurs at its fiftieth day.

References

Syriac Christianity